is a Japanese manga written and illustrated by Kouji Seo. The series is a character-driven romance set in the same universe and time period as the manga and anime series, Suzuka. It follows Haruto Kirishima, a self-conscious teenage boy, and Yuzuki Eba, a boisterous teenage girl who has moved from Tokyo into the Kirishima family's hometown.

A Town Where You Live was published as a series in the Japanese magazine Weekly Shōnen Magazine, which has been published by Kodansha since June 2008. As of January 2014, Kodansha has compiled its chapters into 26 bound volumes. The final chapter was released on February 12, 2014, in the 11th issue of Weekly Shōnen Magazine, and the final volume was released on March 17, 2014.

On October 30, 2013, Crunchyroll Manga was launched and included A Town Where You Live in its library. The series was also published in several languages, including French and Chinese.

Volume list

References

External links
 Official A Town Where You Live website 
 Author's A Town Where You Live site 
 

Town Where You Live, A